Flavobacterium chilense is a Gram-negative and non-endospore-forming bacterium from the genus of Flavobacterium which has been isolated from an external lesion from a rainbow trout (Oncorhynchus mykiss) from a fish farm in Chile.

References

 

chilense
Bacteria described in 2012